Exwick is an historic parish and manor in Devon, England, which today is a north-western suburb of the City of Exeter. Its name is derived from the River Exe, which forms its eastern boundary. It is also an Ecclesiastical parish and an electoral ward.

Mentioned in the Domesday Book, it was the site of farms, orchards and mills. Exwick meaning farm by the river Exe.

Being on the edge of the Exe floodplain, mill industries were important in Exwick. A leat from the Exe was dug before the Doomsday book was compiled. Other industries formerly in the area include clothmaking, aeroparts and baking. Manufacture of wooden flooring continues to this day.

There were a number of large houses in the area including Cleve House which became a Guide Dogs for the Blind training centre in the 1950s. Later it became private houses and the site of a new primary school. The Mallet family bought Exwick Mill.

Another important family with an Exwick Connection were the Gibbs. Andrew Gibbs from Clyst St Mary in Exeter, following several adventures, was involved in setting up the Antony Gibbs & Sons cloth business in 1778. William Gibbs paid to make Exwick a separate parish from St Thomas and extend the Chapel of ease into the full church of St. Andrews.

The area is often used as a location for painters to look back at Exeter, including Frances Towne in 1773 and J. M. W. Turner in 1811.

The murder of Kate Bushell, one of Britain's most high-profile unsolved murders, occurred in Exwick in November 1997.

Public transport
Public transport in Exwick is limited to buses, operated by Stagecoach Devon, and taxis. The bus services are the E, F1 and F2. Railway services are provided at Exeter St Davids station.

Kate Bushell murder

A high-profile, random murder of a child occurred in Exwick in 1997, which today remains one of the UK's highest-profile unsolved murders. 14-year-old Kate Bushell, a pupil at what is now West Exe School, had her throat cut by an unidentified attacker while walking her dog along Exwick Lane on 15 November 1997. Despite the police insisting the killer must be local and repeatedly appealing for locals to come forward with information on Crimewatch, the attacker has never been identified. There remains a £10,000 reward for information leading to the capture of the killer.

Gallery

References

Areas of Exeter
Former manors in Devon